Paul Kevin Riley (born 18 November 1981) is an English cricketer. Riley is a right-handed batsman. He was born in Rushcliffe, Nottinghamshire.

Riley represented the Nottinghamshire Cricket Board in a single List A match against Cumberland in the 1st round of the 2003 Cheltenham & Gloucester Trophy which was played in 2002. In his only List A match he scored a 2 runs.

He currently plays club cricket for Caythorpe Cricket Club in Nottinghamshire Cricket Board Premier League.

References

External links
Paul Riley at Cricinfo
Paul Riley at CricketArchive

1981 births
Living people
People from Rushcliffe (district)
Cricketers from Nottinghamshire
English cricketers
Nottinghamshire Cricket Board cricketers